Steven Craig Taylor (born February 9, 1956) is a former minor league baseball player and Delaware politician.

A native of Delaware, Taylor played baseball for the University of Delaware. In 1976, he played collegiate summer baseball with the Chatham A's of the Cape Cod Baseball League and was named a league all-star. Taylor then played for the Columbus Clippers until he had an arm injury that removed him from baseball.

He then moved back to Delaware.  He was then involved in banking.  He was elected to the Delaware House of Representatives in 1984.  He was also a longtime supporter of bringing a minor league baseball team to Delaware and worked tirelessly to accomplish this goal.

Taylor was a member of the Church of Jesus Christ of Latter-day Saints.

Taylor was inducted into the Delaware Sports Museum and Hall of Fame in 2003.

References

External links
 history of Delaware minor league stadium
 Delaware Sports Hall of Fame 2003 inductees list
 Church News, November 26, 1988
 https://query.nytimes.com/gst/fullpage.html?res=9C0CE1D71738F933A15756C0A966958260
 https://web.archive.org/web/20090316045602/http://www.bluehens.com/sportsinfo/hall_of_fame/1999/stevetaylor.html

American athlete-politicians
American Latter Day Saints
Delaware Fightin' Blue Hens baseball players
Chatham Anglers players
Columbus Clippers players
Living people
Members of the Delaware House of Representatives
1956 births